Typhonium weipanum is a species of plant in the arum family that is endemic to Australia.

Etymology
The specific epithet weipanum refers to the type locality.

Description
The species is a deciduous, geophytic, perennial herb, which sprouts from a tuberous rhizome 2 cm in diameter. The leaves are trilobed. The flower is enclosed in a purple spathe about 9.5 cm long.

Distribution and habitat
The species is known only from the vicinity of Weipa, on the tropical Cape York Peninsula of Far North Queensland, where it is found on the edge of open Eucalyptus tetrodonta woodland.

References

 
weipanum
Monocots of Australia
Flora of Queensland
Plants described in 1993
Taxa named by Alistair Hay